Francis Bowes Sayre may refer to:

 Francis Bowes Sayre Sr. (1885–1972), professor at Harvard Law School 
 Francis Bowes Sayre Jr. (1915–2008), Dean of the National Cathedral in Washington, USA